Jakub Michał Niemczyk (born 22 January 2004) is a Polish footballer who plays as a forward for Burton Albion.

Career statistics

References

External links
Polish Football Almanac

Living people
2004 births
Polish footballers
Polish expatriate footballers
Polish expatriate sportspeople in England
Expatriate footballers in England
Association football forwards
Burton Albion F.C. players